Su Shi (8 January 1037 – 24 August 1101), courtesy name Zizhan, art name Dongpo, was a Chinese calligrapher, essayist, gastronomer, pharmacologist, poet, politician, and travel writer during the Song dynasty. A major personality of the Song era, at times holding high-level political positions, Su Shi was also an important figure in Song Dynasty politics, aligning himself with Sima Guang and others, against the New Policy party led by Wang Anshi, gaining some level of popular support through his actions, and also sometimes experiencing politically motivated reversals to his government career.

Su Shi is widely regarded as one of the most accomplished figures in classical Chinese literature, having produced some of the most well-known poems, lyrics, prose, and essays. Su Shi was famed as an essayist, and his prose writings lucidly contribute to the understanding of topics such as 11th-century Chinese travel literature or detailed information on the contemporary Chinese iron industry. His poetry has a long history of popularity and influence in China, Japan, and other areas in the near vicinity and is well known in the English-speaking parts of the world through the translations by Arthur Waley, among others. In terms of the arts, Su Shi has some claim to being "the pre-eminent personality of the eleventh century." Among the topics he wrote on was cuisine, where he is considered to have had a profound influence. Dongpo pork, a prominent dish in Hangzhou cuisine, is named in his honor.

Life
Su Shi was born in Meishan, near Mount Emei today the Sichuan province. His brother Su Zhe and his father Su Xun were both famous scholar-bureaucrats. His given name, Shi, refers to the crossbar railing at the front of a chariot; Su Xun felt that the railing was a humble, but indispensable, part of a carriage.

Su Shi's early education was conducted under a Daoist priest at a local village school. Later his educated mother took over. Su Shi married at the age of 17. Su Shi and his younger brother Su Zhe had a close relationship, and in 1057, when Su Shi was 19, he and his brother both passed the (highest-level) civil service examinations to attain the degree of jinshi, a prerequisite for high government office. His accomplishments at such a young age attracted the attention of Emperor Renzong, and also that of Ouyang Xiu, who became Su's patron thereafter. Ouyang had already been known as an admirer of Su Xun, sanctioning his literary style at court and stating that no other pleased him more. When the 1057 jinshi examinations were given, Ouyang Xiu required—without prior notice—that candidates were to write in the ancient prose style when answering questions on the Confucian classics. The Su brothers gained high honors for what were deemed impeccable answers and achieved celebrity status, especially in the case of Su Shi's exceptional performance in the subsequent 1061 decree examinations.

Beginning in 1060 and throughout the following twenty years, Su Shi held a variety of government positions throughout China; most notably in Hangzhou, where he was responsible for constructing a pedestrian causeway across the West Lake that still bears his name: sudi (Su Causeway). He had served as a magistrate in Mi Prefecture, which is located in modern-day Zhucheng County of Shandong province. Later, when he was governor of Xuzhou, he wrote a memorial to the throne in 1078 complaining about the troubling economic conditions and potential for armed rebellion in Liguo Industrial Prefecture, where a large part of the Chinese iron industry was located.

Su Shi was often at odds with the political faction headed by Wang Anshi. Su Shi once wrote a poem criticizing Wang Anshi's reforms, especially the government monopoly imposed on the salt industry. The dominance of the reformist faction at court allowed the New Policy Group greater ability to have Su Shi exiled for political crimes. The claim was that Su Shi was criticizing the emperor, when in fact Su Shi's poetry was aimed at criticizing Wang's reforms. It should be said that Wang Anshi played no part in this action against Su, for he had retired from public life in 1076 and established a cordial relationship with Su Shi. Su Shi's first remote trip of exile (1080–1086) was to Huangzhou, Hubei. This post carried a nominal title, but no stipend, leaving Su in poverty. During this period, he began Buddhist meditation.  With help from a friend, Su Shi built a small residence on a parcel of land in 1081. Su Shi lived at a farm called Dongpo ('Eastern Slope'), from which he took his literary pseudonym. While banished to Hubei province, he grew fond of the area he lived in; many of the poems considered his best were written in this period. His most famous piece of calligraphy, Han Shi Tie, was also written there. In 1086, Su Shi and all other banished statesmen were recalled to the capital due to the ascension of a new government. However, Su Shi was banished a second time (1094–1100) to Huizhou (now in Guangdong province) and Danzhou, Hainan. In 1098 the Dongpo Academy in Hainan was built on the site of the residence that he lived in whilst in exile.

Although political bickering and opposition usually split ministers of court into rivaling groups, there were moments of non-partisanship and cooperation from both sides. For example, although the prominent scientist and statesman Shen Kuo (1031–1095) was one of Wang Anshi's most trusted associates and political allies, Shen nonetheless befriended Su Shi.  Su Shi was aware that it was Shen Kuo who, as regional inspector of Zhejiang, presented Su Shi's poetry to the court sometime between 1073 and 1075 with concern that it expressed abusive and hateful sentiments against the Song court. It was these poetry pieces that Li Ding and Shu Dan later utilized in order to instigate a law case against Su Shi, although until that point Su Shi did not think much of Shen Kuo's actions in bringing the poetry to light.

After a long period of political exile, Su Shi received a pardon in 1100 and was posted to Chengdu. However, he died in Changzhou, Jiangsu after his period of exile and while he was en route to his new assignment in the year 1101. Su Shi was 64 years old. After his death he gained even greater popularity, as people sought to collect his calligraphy, paintings depicting him, stone inscriptions marking his visit to numerous places, and built shrines in his honor. He was also depicted in artwork made posthumously, such as in Li Song's (1190–1225) painting of Su traveling in a boat, known as Su Dongpo at Red Cliff, after Su Song's poem written about a 3rd-century Chinese battle.

Family

Su Shi had three wives. His first wife was Wang Fu (1039–1065), an astute, quiet lady from Sichuan who married him at the age of sixteen. She died 13 years later in 1065, on the second day of the fifth Chinese lunar month (Gregorian calendar 14 June), after bearing him a son, Su Mai. Heartbroken, Su Shi wrote a memorial for her, stating that Wang Fu was not just a virtuous wife but also advised him frequently on the integrity of his acquaintances when he was an official.

Ten years after the death of his first wife, Su Shi composed a (cí) poem after dreaming of the deceased Wang Fu in the night at Mi Prefecture. The poem, "To the tune of 'Of Jinling'", remains one of the most famous poems Su Shi wrote.

In 1068, two years after Wang Fu's death, Su Shi married Wang Runzhi (1048–93), cousin of his first wife, and 11 years his junior. Wang Runzhi spent the next 15 years accompanying Su Shi through his ups and downs in officialdom and political exile. Su Shi praised Runzhi for being an understanding wife who treated his three sons equally (his eldest, Su Mai, was born by Wang Fu). Once, Su Shi was angry with his young son for not understanding his unhappiness during his political exile. Wang Runzhi chided Su Shi for his silliness, prompting Su Shi to write the domestic poem "Young Son".

Wang Runzhi died in 1093, at forty-six, after bearing two sons, Su Dai and Su Guo. Overcome with grief, Su Shi expressed his wish to be buried with her in her memorial. On his second wife's second birthday after her death, Su Shi wrote another cí poem, "To the tune of 'Butterflies going after Flowers'", for her.

Su's third wife, Wang Zhaoyun (1062–1095) was his handmaiden who was a former Qiantang singing artist.  Wang was only about ten (eleven sui) when she became his personal servant. She taught herself to read, having formerly been illiterate. Wang Zhaoyun was probably the most famous of Su's companions. Su's friend Qin Guan wrote a poem, "A Gift for Dongpo's concubine Zhaoyun", praising her beauty and lovely voice. Su Shi himself dedicated a number of his poems to Zhaoyun, including "To the Tune of 'Song of the South'"(), "Verses for Zhaoyun", "To the Tune of 'The Beauty Who Asks One To Stay'", and "To the Tune of 'The Moon at Western Stream'". Zhaoyun remained a faithful companion to Su Shi after Runzhi's death, but died of illness on 13 August 1095 at Huizhou. Zhaoyun bore Su Shi a son, Su Dun, on 15 November 1083, who died in infancy. After Zhaoyun's death, Su Shi never married again.

Being a government official in a family of officials, Su Shi was often separated from his loved ones depending on his posting. In 1078, he was serving as prefect of Suzhou. His beloved younger brother was able to join him for the mid-autumn festival, which inspired the poem "Mid-Autumn Moon" reflecting on the preciousness of time with family. It was written to be sung to the tune of "Yang Pass."

As evening clouds withdraw a clear cool air floods in
the jade wheel passes silently across the Silver River
this life this night has rarely been kind
where will we see this moon next year
(translation by Red Pine)

Su Shi had three sons who survived to adulthood: the eldest, Su Mai, who would also become a government official by 1084.; the second, Su Dai; and the third, Su Guo. When Su Shi died in 1101, his younger brother Su Zhe buried him alongside second wife Wang Runzhi according to his wishes.

Work

Poetry

Around 2,700 of Su Shi's poems have survived, along with 800 written letters. Su Shi excelled in the shi, ci and fu forms of poetry, as well as prose, calligraphy and painting. Some of his notable works include the First and Second Chibifu ( The Red Cliffs, written during his first exile), Nian Nu Jiao: Chibi Huai Gu ( Remembering Chibi, to the tune of Nian Nu Jiao) and Shui diao ge tou ( Remembering Su Zhe on the Mid-Autumn Festival). The two former poems were inspired by the Battle of Chibi, a naval battle of the Three Kingdoms era that occurred in the year 208. The bulk of his poems are in the shi style, but his poetic fame rests largely on his 350 ci style poems. Su Shi also founded the haofang school, which cultivated an attitude of heroic abandon. In both his written works and his visual art, he combined spontaneity, objectivity and vivid descriptions of natural phenomena. Su Shi wrote essays as well, many of which are on politics and governance, including his Liuhoulun. His popular politically charged poetry was often the reason for the wrath of Wang Anshi's supporters towards him, culminating with the Crow Terrace Poetry Trial of 1079. He also wrote poems on Buddhist topics, including a poem later extensively commented on by Eihei Dōgen, the founder of the Japanese Sōtō school of Zen, in a chapter of his work Shōbōgenzō entitled The Sounds of Valley Streams, the Forms of Mountains.

Travel record literature

Su Shi also wrote of his travel experiences in 'daytrip essays', which belonged in part to the popular Song era literary category of 'travel record literature' (youji wenxue) that employed the use of narrative, diary, and prose styles of writing. Although other works in Chinese travel literature contained a wealth of cultural, geographical, topographical, and technical information, the central purpose of the daytrip essay was to use a setting and event in order to convey a philosophical or moral argument, which often employed persuasive writing. For example, Su Shi's daytrip essay known as Record of Stone Bell Mountain investigates and then judges whether or not ancient texts on 'stone bells' were factually accurate.

A memorial concerning the iron industry

While acting as Governor of Xuzhou, Su Shi in 1078 CE wrote a memorial to the imperial court about problems faced in the Liguo Industrial Prefecture which was under his watch and administration. In an interesting and revealing passage about the Chinese iron industry during the latter half of the 11th century, Su Shi wrote about the enormous size of the workforce employed in the iron industry, competing provinces that had rival iron manufacturers seeking favor from the central government, as well as the danger of rising local strongmen who had the capability of raiding the industry and threatening the government with effectively armed rebellion. It also becomes clear in reading the text that prefectural government officials in Su's time often had to negotiate with the central government in order to meet the demands of local conditions.

Technical issues of hydraulic engineering

During the ancient Han dynasty (202 BCE – 220 CE) of China, the sluice gate and canal lock of the flash lock had been known. By the 10th century the latter design was improved upon in China with the invention of the canal pound lock, allowing different adjusted levels of water along separated and gated segments of a canal. This innovation allowed for larger transport barges to pass safely without danger of wrecking upon the embankments, and was an innovation praised by those such as Shen Kuo (1031–1095). Shen also wrote in his Dream Pool Essays of the year 1088 that, if properly used, sluice gates positioned along irrigation canals were most effective in depositing silt for fertilization. Writing earlier in his Dongpo Zhilin of 1060, Su Shi came to a different conclusion, writing that the Chinese of a few centuries past had perfected this method and noted that it was ineffective in use by his own time.

Although Su Shi made no note of it in his writing, the root of this problem was merely the needs of agriculture and transportation conflicting with one another.

Gastronome

Su is called one of the four classical gastronomes. The other three are Ni Zan (1301–74), Xu Wei (1521–93), and Yuan Mei (1716–97). There is a legend, for which there is no evidence, that by accident he invented Dongpo pork, a famous dish in later centuries.  Lin Hsiang Ju and Lin Tsuifeng in their scholarly Chinese Gastronomy give a recipe, "The Fragrance of Pork: Tungpo Pork", and remark that the "square of fat is named after Su Dongpo, the poet, for unknown reasons. Perhaps it is just because he would have liked it." A story runs that once Su Shi had decided to make stewed pork. Then an old friend visited him in the middle of the cooking and challenged him to a game of Chinese chess. Su Shi had totally forgotten the stew, which in the meantime had now become extremely thick-cooked, until its very fragrant smell reminded him of it.   Some legends point to the contrary, however, where other villagers simply named the pork dish after him to honour his death, although no concrete evidence points to any conclusion.

Su, to explain his vegetarian inclinations, said that he never had been comfortable with killing animals for his dinner table, but had a craving for certain foods, such as clams, so he could not desist. When he was imprisoned his views changed: "Since my imprisonment I have not killed a single thing... having experienced such worry and danger myself, when I felt just like a fowl waiting in the kitchen, I can no longer bear to cause any living creature to suffer immeasurable fright and pain simply to please my palate."

See also

Chinese literature
Chinese poetry
Classical Chinese poetry
Crow Terrace Poetry Trial
Culture of the Song Dynasty
History of the Song Dynasty
Shen Kuo
Song poetry
Tao Yuanming
Su Shi's destiny quote
Technology of the Song Dynasty
Wang Shen

Notes

Translations
Watson, Burton (translator). Selected Poems of Su Tung-p'o (English only) (Copper Canyon Press, 1994)
Xu Yuanchong (translator). Selected Poems of Su Shi. (Chinese with English translations). Hunan: Hunan People's Publishing House, 2007.

Bibliography

Ebrey, Walthall, Palais (2006). East Asia: A Cultural, Social, and Political History. Boston: Houghton Mifflin Company. .
Ebrey, Patricia Buckley (1999). The Cambridge Illustrated History of China. Cambridge: Cambridge University Press.  (hardback);  (paperback).
Egan, Ronald. Word, Image, and Deed in the Life of Su Shi. Cambridge (Mass.): Harvard University Press, Harvard-Yenching Institute Monograph Series, 1994. .
Fuller, Michael Anthony. The Road to East Slope: The Development of Su Shi's Poetic Voice. Stanford University Press, 1990. .
Hargett, James M. "Some Preliminary Remarks on the Travel Records of the Song Dynasty (960-1279)," Chinese Literature: Essays, Articles, Reviews (July 1985): 67–93.
Hartman, Charles. "Poetry and Politics in 1079: The Crow Terrace Poetry Case of Su Shih," Chinese Literature: Essays, Articles, Reviews (Volume 12, 1990): 15–44.
Hatch, George. (1993) "Su Hsun's Pragmatic Statecraft" in Ordering the World : Approaches to State and Society in Sung Dynasty China, ed. Robert P. Hymes, 59–76. Berkeley: Berkeley University of California Press. .
Hegel, Robert E. "The Sights and Sounds of Red Cliffs: On Reading Su Shi," Chinese Literature: Essays, Articles, Reviews (Volume 20 1998): 11–30.
Lin Yutang.  The Gay Genius: The Life and Times of Su Tungpo.  J. Day Co., 1947. .

Needham, Joseph (1986). Science and Civilization in China: Volume 1, Introductory Orientations. Taipei: Caves Books, Ltd.
Needham, Joseph (1986). Science and Civilization in China: Volume 4, Physics and Physical Technology, Part 3, Civil Engineering and Nautics. Taipei: Caves Books Ltd.
Sivin, Nathan (1995). "Shen Kua." In Sivin's Science in Ancient China: Researches and Reflections, text III: 1-53. Haldershot (Hampshire, England), and Burlington (Vermont, USA): VARIORUM, Ashgate Publishing. .
Wagner, Donald B. "The Administration of the Iron Industry in Eleventh-Century China," Journal of the Economic and Social History of the Orient (Volume 44 2001): 175–197.
 
 Yang, Vincent. Nature and Self: A Study of the Poetry of Su Dongpo, With Comparisons to the Poetry of William Wordsworth (American University Studies, Series III). Peter Lang Pub Inc, 1989. .

Further reading
 Jacques, Rob. Adagio for Su Tung-p'o: Poems on How Consciousness Uses Flesh to Float through Space/Time.   (Fernwood Press, 2019) . Using lines from Su Shi's poems as epigraphs, Jacques explores the 11th Century Chinese poet's metaphysical views on life, love and eternity from a 21st Century perspective.
Wang, Yugen. "The Limits of Poetry as Means of Social Criticism: The 1079 Literary Inquisition against Su Shi Revisited." Journal of Song-Yuan Studies.  Volume 41, 2011. pp. 29–65. 10.1353/sys.2011.0028. Available at Project MUSE.

External links
 
 
 
 Su Shi and his Calligraphy Gallery at China Online Museum
 Su Shi: Poems
 Poems by Su Shi

 
12th-century Chinese poets
1037 births
1101 deaths
11th-century Chinese calligraphers
11th-century Chinese painters
11th-century Chinese poets
12th-century Chinese calligraphers
12th-century Chinese painters
Biologists from Sichuan
Buddhist artists
Chemists from Sichuan
Chinese pharmacologists
Chinese scholars
Chinese tea masters
Chinese travel writers
Painters from Sichuan
Physicians from Sichuan
Poets from Sichuan
Politicians from Meishan
Recipients of Chinese royal pardons
Song dynasty calligraphers
Song dynasty essayists
Song dynasty painters
Song dynasty poets
Song dynasty politicians from Sichuan
Writers from Meishan
Gastronomes